Jerry Franklin (born January 10, 1988) is a former American football linebacker. He was originally signed by the Denver Broncos as an undrafted free agent in 2012. Franklin played college football at the University of Arkansas. He also was on the children's television program Barney & Friends

High school career
Franklin attended Marion High School, where he was named the Class 6A Offensive Player of the Year and the 6A East Back of the Year as a senior. Considered a three-star recruit by Rivals.com, Franklin was listed No. 38 among safety prospects in the nation.

College career

Originally recruited as a defensive back, Franklin moved from safety to linebacker during his redshirt season in 2007. Franklin has started at multiple positions for the Razorbacks, including weakside linebacker and middle linebacker. In his freshman season, Franklin recorded a team-high 87 tackles, and had two forced fumbles and two fumble recoveries. He was named to Sporting News' Freshman All-American team, as well as College Football News' Second-team. During a time when Arkansas's defense struggled with consecutive 12th-place finishes in the SEC in total yards allowed in 2008 and 2009, Franklin was a mainstay of the defense. In his sophomore season he again led the team in tackles with 94, and also had five tackles for loss and one and a half sacks. He recovered two fumbles on the year, returning one of them 85 yards for a touchdown against Texas A&M. Franklin finished his career as a four-year starter for the Hogs. He led Arkansas in tackles in each of the past four years, finishing with 100 or more tackles in his junior and senior seasons- 101 in 2011 and 100 in 2010.

Professional career

Denver Broncos
On April 28, 2012, Franklin was signed as an undrafted free agent by the Denver Broncos.

Carolina Panthers
After being waived by the Broncos before the start of the regular season, Franklin was added to the Carolina Panthers' practice squad on October 17, 2012.  He was released from the Panthers practice squad on November 13, 2012.

Dallas Cowboys
Franklin was signed to the Dallas Cowboys' practice squad on November 14, 2012. He later chose to leave the squad and join the Chicago Bears' 53 man roster.

Chicago Bears
Franklin was signed by the Chicago Bears on December 11, 2012 to a two-year contract. On August 30, 2013, Franklin was released by the Bears. On September 1, he was added to the Bears' practice squad. He was promoted to the active roster on October 18 after D. J. Williams was placed on injured reserve.

Kansas City Chiefs
Franklin signed with the Kansas City Chiefs' practice squad on September 1, 2014. He was promoted to the active roster on September 9, 2014. He was waived by the team on November 8, 2014.

New Orleans Saints
Franklin was signed to the New Orleans Saints' practice squad on November 28, 2014. He was promoted to the active roster on December 26, 2014.

Detroit Lions
On February 11, 2016, Franklin signed a one-year contract with the Detroit Lions.

References

External links
Official bio at Arkansas

1988 births
Living people
American football linebackers
Arkansas Razorbacks football players
Carolina Panthers players
Chicago Bears players
Dallas Cowboys players
Denver Broncos players
Kansas City Chiefs players
People from Marion, Arkansas